Thomas Mayer is a Grand Prix motorcycle racer from Germany.

Career statistics

By season

Races by year
(key)

References

External links
http://www.motogp.com/en/riders/Thomas+Mayer

1982 births
Living people
German motorcycle racers
125cc World Championship riders
People from Passau
Sportspeople from Lower Bavaria